Thomas Rolf Truhitte is an American heldentenor who has become noted in recent years for his roles in Wagnerian operas. The son of actor Daniel Truhitte, his middle name is a tribute to his father's most famous role as "Rolf" in the movie adaptation of The Sound of Music.

Thomas was in the resident company of Opera San Jose from 1997 to 2001 and appeared there in 11 productions, in many leading roles.

Performances

Festival dei Due Mondi, Spoleto, Italy
 Lohengrin  (Richard Wagner) - "Lohengrin"

Minnesota Opera
 Der Fliegende Hollaender (Richard Wagner) - "Erik"

San Jose Opera
 Carmen  (Georges Bizet) - "Don Julio"

Manaus Music Festival, Brazil
 Die Walküre  Richard Wagner - "Siegmund"

Opera San Jose
 Rigoletto  (Giuseppe Verdi) - "Duke"
 La bohème  (Giacomo Puccini - "Moman"
 Eugene Onegin  (Peter Ilyich Tchaikovsky) - "Lenski"
 La traviata  (Giuseppe Verdi) - "Alfredo"
 Carmen  (Georges Bizet) - "Don Jose"
 Die lustige Witwe  (Franz Lehár) - "Danilo"
 Don Giovanni  (Wolfgang Amadeus Mozart) - "Don Giovanni"
 The Rake's Progress  (Igor Stravinsky - "Tom"
 Die Zauberflöte (Wolfgang Amadeus Mozart) - "Susan"
 Lucia di Lammermoor   (Gaetano Donizetti) - "Edgardo"
 Of Mice and Men (Carlisle Floyd - "Curley"

San Jose Opera
 Carmen  (Georges Bizet) - "Don Jose"

Minnesota Opera
 Carmen  (Georges Bizet) - "Don Jose"

Venice Opera
 Fidelio - "Florestan
 Madama Butterfly - "Pinkerton"
 Tristan und Isolde - "Tristan"
 Die Walküre  (Richard Wagner) - "Siegmund"

External links
 Thomas Rolf Truhitte's website
 His page at Opera San Jose
 8 page article in the April/May 2005 issue of Silicon Implants Magazine

American operatic tenors
Living people
Heldentenors
Year of birth missing (living people)